The neighbouring miner bee (Andrena vicina) is a species of miner bee in the family Andrenidae. Another common name for this species is the neighborly miner. It is found in North America.

References

Further reading

External links

 

vicina
Articles created by Qbugbot
Insects described in 1853